Tony Ave (born November 10, 1968) is a race car driver born in Hurley, Wisconsin. He competed in the Grand-Am Series from 2000 until 2002, in Formula Atlantic from 1996 until 2001, and in the Trans-Am Series since 2009. He also made three Indy Lights starts in 1993 and one Indy Pro Series start in 2003. He also has sporadic starts in NASCAR as a road course ringer.

Trans-Am
In 2009 he was a regular competitor in the revived SCCA Trans-Am Series, driving a Chevrolet Corvette. In 2010, he brought Chevrolet its first Trans Am championship since Paul Gentilozzi in 1998.

He won the 2010 and 2011 Trans-Am Series Championships. Ave owns Tony Ave Motorsports, which has become one of the most popular race teams amongst fans. However, he mostly drives for Lamers Racing.

NASCAR

In 2004, Ave made his NASCAR Nextel Cup Series debut when he drove the No. 80 car owned by Hover Motorsports, a satellite team of Joe Gibbs Racing. Starting 42nd, Ave dropped out after 84 laps with a brake problem, finishing 31st.

Ave returned to the Cup Series in 2009, competed at Watkins Glen on August 10, 2009 in the rain-delayed Heluva Good! Sour Cream Dips at The Glen. Ave completed eight laps and finished 43rd in his No. 37 Long John Silver's Dodge owned by Front Row Motorsports. Ave also participated in the NASCAR Nationwide Series' NAPA Parts D'Auto 200 presented by Dodge at Circuit Gilles Villeneuve as a road course ringer.

Ave participated in the No. 35 car owned by TriStar Motorsports in the 2010 Bucyrus 200 at Road America in his home state of Wisconsin. After racing in the Top 10 for most of the race, he spun out on the final lap and dropped out of the Top 10. He returned to the No. 35 team for the other two road course races, finishing 15th at Watkins Glen and leading one lap in Montreal – his first and only lap led in his Nationwide Series career.

In 2011, Ave made his so far last NASCAR attempt at Sonoma, attempting to qualify his No. 38 Long John Silver's car for FRM. He was bumped out of the field by Andy Pilgrim and did not qualify.

Other racing
In April 2002, Ave, along with Andy Hillenburg, tested for the Team Racing Auto Circuit series at Atlanta Motor Speedway. Four months later, Ave and Boris Said tested for TRAC at Lowe's Motor Speedway.

In 2016, Ave made an agreement with Bill Riley to build a prototype chassis for ELMS for the P3 and IMSA for the Prototype Challenge.

Motorsports career results

SCCA National Championship Runoffs

NASCAR
(key) (Bold – Pole position awarded by qualifying time. Italics – Pole position earned by points standings or practice time. * – Most laps led.)

Sprint Cup Series

Nationwide Series

Craftsman Truck Series

ARCA Re/Max Series
(key) (Bold – Pole position awarded by qualifying time. Italics – Pole position earned by points standings or practice time. * – Most laps led.)

References

External links

 Tony Ave Racing Products official website
 

Living people
1968 births
People from Hurley, Wisconsin
Racing drivers from Wisconsin
24 Hours of Daytona drivers
Rolex Sports Car Series drivers
Trans-Am Series drivers
NASCAR drivers
ARCA Menards Series drivers
Indy Lights drivers
Atlantic Championship drivers
SCCA National Championship Runoffs winners
U.S. F2000 National Championship drivers
USAC Silver Crown Series drivers
European Le Mans Series drivers
Murphy Prototypes drivers
WeatherTech SportsCar Championship drivers